Our Town is a census-designated place and unincorporated community in Tallapoosa County, Alabama, United States. Its population was 641 as of the 2010 census.

Our Town had its start around 1913 when the railroad was extended to that point. The community was named by John S. Jones by saying, "It's not your town, or my town, it is Our Town".(5)

Demographics

References
5.  (May 14, 1978). "Wilder may have gotten same result with visit to Our Town, Ala." The Birmingham News.  p. 20A 

Census-designated places in Tallapoosa County, Alabama
Census-designated places in Alabama